Trevor Antonius Zwetsloot (born 16 October 1999) is a New Zealand footballer who plays as a defensive midfielder for USL Championship club Pittsburgh Riverhounds.

Early life
Zwetsloot was born in The Netherlands to Dutch and American parents, before he and his family moved to New Zealand when he was two years old.

Career

Youth
Zwetsloot played with the Waitakere Academy until 2015, when he signed with East Coast Bays. In 2016, Zwetsloot moved to the IMG Academy in Florida. He was scouted by the University of North Carolina at Charlotte to play college soccer, but instead moved to Germany to join Werder Bremen's academy. With Bremen, Zwetsloot made eleven appearances for their U19 side, and a single appearance for Werder Bremen II in the Regionalliga in 2018. He left Bremen in the summer of 2019.

Melbourne Knights
In February 2021, Zwetsloot signed with National Premier Leagues Victoria side Melbourne Knights, who he made sixteen league appearances for.

New England Revolution II
On 22 February 2022, Zwetsloot signed with MLS Next Pro side New England Revolution II. He made his debut for New England on 27 March 2022, starting in a 2–2 draw with New York City FC II. Following the 2022 season, his option was declined by New England.

Pittsburgh Riverhounds
On 14 March 2023, Zwetsloot joined USL Championship side Pittsburgh Riverhounds for their 2023 season.

References

1999 births
Living people
New Zealand association footballers
Association football defenders
New Zealand under-20 international footballers
New Zealand youth international footballers
Regionalliga players
East Coast Bays AFC players
IMG Academy alumni
SV Werder Bremen players
Melbourne Knights FC players
New England Revolution II players
New Zealand expatriate association footballers
New Zealand expatriate sportspeople in Australia
Expatriate soccer players in Australia
New Zealand expatriate sportspeople in Germany
Expatriate footballers in Germany
New Zealand expatriate sportspeople in the United States
Pittsburgh Riverhounds SC players
Expatriate soccer players in the United States
MLS Next Pro players
USL Championship players